The 1920 Kentucky Derby was the 46th running of the Kentucky Derby. The race took place on May 8, 1920, and was run at a mile and one-quarter. Paul Jones won the race by a nose after staving off Upset, who showed impressive speed on the home stretch, and On Watch, who was a close third.

Full results

Winning Breeder: John E. Madden; (KY)
Horses Golden Broom, Kinnoul, Simpleton, Ethel Gray, and Westwood scratched before the race.

Payout

 The winner received a purse of $30,375.
 Second place received $4,000.
 Third place received $2,000.
 Fourth place received $275.

References

1920
Kentucky Derby
Derby
Kentucky Derby
Kentucky Derby